This is a list of diplomatic missions in Antigua and Barbuda.  The capital city of St. John's hosts 5 embassies/high commissions.  Several other countries have honorary consuls to provide emergency services to their citizens.

Embassies/High Commission 
St. John's

Consular agent

Non-resident embassies 

 (Washington, D.C.)
 (Caracas)
 (Kingston)
 (Port-of-Spain)
 (Bogotá)
 (Havana)
 (Washington, D.C.)
 (Bridgetown)
 (Kingston)
 (Havana)
 (Washington, D.C.)
 (Bridgetown)
 (Kingston)
 (Havana)
 (Roseau)
 (Havana)
 (Caracas)
 (Castries)
 (Washington, D.C.)
 (Port-of-Spain)
 (Caracas)
 (Santo Domingo)
 (Havana)
 (New York City)
 (Bogota)
 (Georgetown)
 (Havana)
 (Havana)
 (Washington, D.C.)
 (Santo Domingo)
 (Santo Domingo)
 (Port-of-Spain)
 (Washington, D.C.)
 (Kingston)
 (Havana)
 (New York City)
 (New York City)
 (Havana)
 (Havana)
 (Havana)
 (New York City)
 (Washington, D.C.)
 (Caracas)
 (Castries)
 (Havana)
 (Port-of-Spain)
 (Havana)
 (Bridgetown)
 (Havana)
 (Washington, D.C.)
 (Havana)
 (Havana)
 (Washington, D.C.)
 (Havana)
 (Washington, D.C.)
 (Bogotá)
 (Santo Domingo)
 (Kingston)
 (Havana)
 (Kingston)
 (Washington, D.C.)
 (Havana)
 (New York City)
 (Santo Domingo)
 (Stockholm)
 (Santo Domingo)
 (New York City)
 (Havana)
 (New York City)
 (New York City)
 (New York City)
 (Ottawa)
 (Washington, D.C.)
 (Basseterre)
 (New York City)
 (Santo Domingo)
 (New York City)
 (Washington, D.C.)
 (Washington, D.C.)
 (Bridgetown)
 (Havana)
 (New York City)
 (Washington, D.C.)
 (New York City)
 (Havana)
 (Havana)
 (Washington, D.C.)
 (New York City)

Honorary Consulates in Antigua and Barbuda
 (St. John's)

See also
Foreign relations of Antigua and Barbuda

References

External links
 Government of Antigua and Barbuda

 
Diplomatic missions
Antigua and Barbuda
diplomatic missions